.bo is the Internet country code top-level domain (ccTLD) for Bolivia. BO is the ISO 3166-1 code for Bolivia.

It is administered by ADSIB. As of February 2011, the NIC was offering a registration fee of about US$40 per year or 280 $Bs for third-level domain and US$140 per year or 980 $Bs for second level domain.
Registration is at the second or third level.

Brazilian TV Globo has also used this domain for shortener with the glo.bo URL.

Second level domains
 .bo - Any entity, person or corporation either domestic or foreign

Third level domains
 com.bo - Commercial entities
 net.bo - Network service providers
 org.bo - Organizations
 tv.bo - TV media organizations
 mil.bo - Military institutions
 int.bo - International Organizations
 gob.bo - Government (Gobierno)
 edu.bo - Educational institutions

Third level domains restricted only to Bolivian institutions
 mil.bo - Military institutions
 int.bo - International Organizations
 gob.bo - Government (Gobierno)
 edu.bo - Educational institutions

See also
Internet in Bolivia

External links

 IANA .bo whois information

Communications in Bolivia
Country code top-level domains

sv:Toppdomän#B